Gharoli is a census town in East Delhi District in the National Capital Territory of Delhi, India Near Delhi-UP border.The village is 300+ years old.Gharoli is gurjar majority village.Gurjar Gotra is Dedha.The literacy rate is above 90%.The village has more than 14 different cast's people, including Gurjars,brahmans,muslims,ahirs,kumhars,jatav,chauhan, and many others.Many people from village are giving services as doctors,policemen,C.A, advocates,army-men, and many more esteemed jobs

Demographics
 India census, Village Gharoli had a population of 10,978. Males constitute 56% of the population and females 44%. Gharoli has an average literacy rate of 85%, higher than the national average of 59.5%: male literacy is 90%, and female literacy is 80%. In Gharoli, 17% of the population is under 6 years of age.

References

Cities and towns in East Delhi district